Luis Liberman Ginsburg (born 1 August 1946) is a Costa Rican businessman and former Second Vice President of Costa Rica from 2010 to 2014. He was elected in February 2010 on the ticket with President Laura Chinchilla and First Vice President Alfio Piva. Liberman's family moved to Costa Rica from Poland prior to World War II. He is the grandson of the first Mohel of Costa Rica's small Jewish community.

Politics
Liberman was chosen as a vice president to President Laura Chinchilla mainly due to his expertise in economic affairs. He also said that Costa Rica under Chinchilla would be less active in the Middle East and foreign policy would focus more on Latin America while maintaining good relations with Israel, which he described as "excellent" as well as Egypt and other Arab states. He was briefly acting finance minister in 2012.

References

1946 births
Living people
People from San José, Costa Rica
Costa Rican businesspeople
Vice presidents of Costa Rica
Finance ministers of Costa Rica
Costa Rican Jews
Costa Rican people of Polish-Jewish descent
National Liberation Party (Costa Rica) politicians